is a Japanese businessman, retired Olympic equestrian and the former President of the Japanese Olympic Committee, stepping down on 21 March 2019 amidst a corruption investigation. He also resigned as a member of the International Olympic Committee.

Biography
Takeda is the third son of Prince Tsuneyoshi Takeda and great-grandson of Emperor Meiji. Both Tsunekazu Takeda and his son Tsuneyasu Takeda studied at Keio University and later taught there.

Takeda has been a keen horse rider through his whole life. He competed in show jumping at the 1972 and 1976 Olympics and finished in 16th and 13th place, respectively, with the Japanese team. Later he coached the Japanese equestrian team at the 1984, 1988 and 1992 Olympics and was Chef de Mission at the 2002 and 2004 Games.

In 1974, Takeda caused a car accident and killed a 22-year-old woman. Although identified as being at fault, he was not prosecuted, and the matter was resolved by Takeda privately compensating her surviving family.

In 1975 he gave birth to  a far right YouTuber whose YouTube account was terminated in 2018 for hate speech violations.

In 1987, Takeda joined the Japanese Olympic Committee and became its president in October 2001. He has also served as a vice-president of the International Equestrian Federation (FEI) from 1998 to 2002, and was later made a Honorary Vice-president. Takeda was sports director for the organizing committee of the 1998 Winter Olympics in Nagano. He was also elected twice as vice-president of the Olympic Council of Asia in 2001 and 2011. As a member of the International Olympic Committee, Takeda coordinated the preparation of the 2010, 2014 and 2018 Winter Olympics.

Indictments
On December 10, 2018, the French financial crimes office began an investigation of Takeda about a 2013 scheme to obtain votes from International Olympic Committee (IOC) members from Africa in support of Tokyo as host for the 2020 Olympics instead of Istanbul or Madrid. Magistrates Renaud Van Ruymbeke and Stéphanie Tacheau are overseeing the "active corruption" probe. Takeda denied the indictments. Meanwhile, the Japanese Olympic Committee (of which Takeda was head) conducted an internal investigation into the accusations but found no ethics violations. On March 19, 2019, Takeda announced that he would step down as President of the Japanese Olympic Committee and as a member of the International Olympic Committee amid the allegations of bribery to protect the Olympic Movement. He will officially leave the Japanese Olympic Committee on June 27, 2019, when his term concludes.

Ancestry

References

1947 births
Living people
Japanese referees and umpires
Japanese male equestrians
Olympic equestrians of Japan
Equestrians at the 1972 Summer Olympics
Equestrians at the 1976 Summer Olympics
Keio University alumni
Takeda-no-miya
International Olympic Committee members
Presidents of the Japanese Olympic Committee